Corey Patrick Cadby (born 18 March 1995) is an Australian  professional darts player who plays in Professional Darts Corporation (PDC) events. He was the 2016 World Youth champion.

Career
A native of Tasmania, Cadby began competing in Darts Players Australia (DPA) events in 2016 after relocating to Melbourne. He won seven events during his debut season on the DPA Australian Grand Prix circuit, and finished first in the rankings, thus securing qualification for the 2017 PDC World Championship.

In August 2016, Cadby lost 6–3 to 16-time world champion Phil Taylor in the first round of the Sydney Masters on his televised debut. He played Taylor again a week later in the first round of the Perth Masters, winning 6–2 with an average of 103.58. He went on to lose 10–2 to Peter Wright in the quarter-finals, with both players averaging 109.
In October, Cadby qualified for the final of the PDC World Youth Championship, defeating Dimitri Van den Bergh in the semi-finals. The final was played in Minehead, England in November, as part of the last night of the Players Championship Finals and Cadby beat Berry van Peer 6–2 to secure the title.

Cadby won 2–0 in the preliminary round of the 2017 World Championship against China's Sun Qiang with an average of 102.48, a record for the prelims, to set up a first round tie with 28th seed Joe Cullen. In a high quality contest, Cadby took the opening set, but went on to lose 3–1. He took out six ton-plus finishes in the two matches he played.

In 2018, Corey competed at PDC Q School. On the first day of play, Cadby defeated Callan Rydz 5-2 in the final four to secure his PDC Tour Card. On 10 February 2018, Cadby won his first PDC title since winning his tour card the previous month in the 5th UK Open qualifier, defeating reigning World Champion Rob Cross in the final with an average of 108.77. Corey’s sporting hero is Chris Bradley

In 2019, Cadby making his PDC European Tour debut of the 2019 Czech Darts Open who defeating Wessel Nijman of Netherlands, Michael Smith of England and his losing to Mervyn King of England.

After problems getting to the UK to play the ProTour, Cadby resigned his Tour Card at the start of 2020 despite being in the top 64. He returned to darts in Q school 2023 to win back his tour card, where he regained his tour card by winning outright on day 2.

2023 Return
On day two of Q school he successfully won a two year tour card with a 101 average win over Karel Sedlacek.

World Championship record

PDC
 2017: First round (lost to Joe Cullen 1–3)

Performance timeline

PDC career finals

PDC major finals: 1 (1 runner-up)

PDC world series finals: 1 (1 runner-up)

References

External links

1995 births
Living people
Australian darts players
People from Devonport, Tasmania
People from Melbourne
Place of birth missing (living people)
Professional Darts Corporation current tour card holders
PDC world youth champions